Storyteller – The Complete Anthology: 1964–1990, often referred to as The Storyteller Anthology or simply Storyteller is a 4-disc compilation released by Rod Stewart in 1989 by Warner Bros. Records and contains 65 tracks, five of which had never before been released.

Background
Storyteller spans the whole of Stewart’s career beginning with the 1964 release of "Good Morning Little Schoolgirl" and ending with "Downtown Train", a new song for 1989.  It was designed for release in the US and contains four discs each covering a different period somewhat chronologically.  Disc one spans 1964–1971 and includes "Can I Get a Witness?" recorded while Rod was with Steampacket and which had never before been released.  Disc two spans 1971–1976.  Disc three spans 1975–1981 and includes "To Love Somebody" featuring Booker T. & the M.G.'s.  In the liner notes Rod recalls that this version was recorded shortly before Al Jackson, Jr. was killed.  Disc four spans 1981–1989 and includes never before released versions of "I Don't Want to Talk About It" and "This Old Heart of Mine". Originally released in an LP-sized box package, it was re-released on 17 November 2009 in a more compact boxed configuration.

Track listing

Production
"Can I Get a Witness?" produced by Giorgio Gomelsky
"To Love Somebody" produced by Tom Dowd
"I Don't Want to Talk About It" produced by Rod Stewart and Bernard Edwards
"This Old Heart of Mine (Is Weak for You)" produced by Bernard Edwards and Trevor Horn
"Downtown Train" produced by Trevor Horn
Compiled and Coordinated by Gregg Geller
A&R Compilation Executive: Michael Ostin
Management: Arnold Stiefel and Randy Phillips

Charts

Weekly charts

Year-end charts

Certifications

References

External links
http://www.rodstewartfanclub.com/about_rod/disco/album_detail.php?album_id=36

Albums produced by Tom Dowd
Albums produced by Bernard Edwards
Albums produced by Trevor Horn
Albums produced by Giorgio Gomelsky
1989 compilation albums
Rod Stewart compilation albums
Warner Records compilation albums